The 2011 Brasil Open was a tennis tournament played on outdoor clay courts. It was the 11th edition of the event known as the Brasil Open, and was part of the ATP World Tour 250 series of the 2011 ATP World Tour. It took place in Costa do Sauípe, Brazil, from February 7 through February 13, 2011.

ATP entrants

Seeds

1 Rankings as of January 31, 2011.

Other entrants
The following players received wildcards into the main draw:
  Guilherme Clézar
  Fernando Romboli
  João Souza

The following players received entry from the qualifying draw:

  Facundo Bagnis
  Rogério Dutra da Silva
  André Ghem
  Leonardo Mayer

Champions

Singles

 Nicolás Almagro def.  Alexandr Dolgopolov, 6–3, 7–6(3).
 This was Almagro's first title of the year, eighth career title, and second win at the event, also winning in 2008.

Doubles

 Marcelo Melo /  Bruno Soares def.  Pablo Andújar /  Daniel Gimeno Traver, 7–6(4), 6–3.

External links
Official website

 
Brasil Open
Brasil Open